Johann Georg Sulzer (16 October 1720 in Winterthur – 27 February 1779 in Berlin) was a Swiss professor of Mathematics, who later on moved on to the field of electricity. He was a Wolffian philosopher and director of the philosophical section of the Berlin Academy of Sciences, and translator of David Hume's An Enquiry Concerning the Principles of Morals into German in 1755.

Sulzer is best known as the subject of an anecdote in the history of the development of the battery. In 1752, Sulzer happened to put the tip of his tongue between pieces of two different metals whose edges were in contact.  He exclaimed, "a pungent sensation, reminds me of the taste of green vitriol when I placed my tongue between these metals." He thought the metals set up a vibratory motion in their particles which excited the nerves of taste. The event became known as the "battery tongue test": the saliva serves as the electrolyte carrying the current between two metallic electrodes.

His General Theory of the Fine Arts has been called "probably the most influential aesthetic compendium of the closing years of the eighteenth century". In it, he "extended Baumgarten's approach into an even more psychological theory that the primary object of enjoyment in aesthetic experience is the state of one's own cognitive condition." Kant had respectfully disagreed with Sulzer's metaphysical hopes. Kant wrote: "I cannot share the opinion so frequently expressed by excellent and thoughtful men (for instance Sulzer) who, being fully conscious of the weakness of the proofs hitherto advanced, indulge in a hope that the future would supply us with evident demonstrations of the two cardinal propositions of pure reason, namely, that there is a God, and that there is a future life. I am certain, on the contrary, that this will never be the case…."

Bibliography
 Unterredungen über die Schönheit der Natur (1750)
 Gedanken über den Ursprung der Wissenschaften und schönen Künste (1762) 
 Allgemeine Theorie der schönen Künste (1771–74) 
 Vermischte philosophische Schriften (1773/81)

Notes

1720 births
1779 deaths
German philosophers
Members of the Prussian Academy of Sciences
German music theorists
German male writers